Stipe Mandalinić (born 9 September 1992) is a Croatian professional handball player for AEK Athens and the Croatian national team.

Honours

Zagreb
Dukat Premier League: 2012-13, 2013-14, 2014-15, 2015-16, 2016-17
Croatian Cup: 2013, 2014, 2015, 2016, 2017
SEHA League: 2012-13

References

1992 births
Living people
Croatian male handball players
RK Zagreb players
Sportspeople from Split, Croatia
Expatriate handball players
Croatian expatriate sportspeople in Germany
Handball-Bundesliga players
Füchse Berlin Reinickendorf HBC players